White Hill is a mountain in Barnstable County, Massachusetts. Clay Hill is located south of White Hill.

References

Mountains of Massachusetts
Mountains of Barnstable County, Massachusetts